General elections were held in the Bahamas on 19 June 1987. The result was a victory for the Progressive Liberal Party, which won 31 of the 49 seats.

Results

References

Bahamas
1987 in the Bahamas
Elections in the Bahamas
Election and referendum articles with incomplete results